Social death is the condition of people not accepted as fully human by wider society. It is used by sociologists such as Orlando Patterson and Zygmunt Bauman, and historians of slavery and the Holocaust to describe the part played by governmental and social  segregation in that process.  Examples of social death are:

Racial and gender exclusion, persecution, slavery, and apartheid.
Governments can exclude individuals or groups from society. Examples: Protestant minority groups in early modern Europe; ostracism in Ancient Athens; Dalits in India; criminals; prostitutes, outlaws
Institutionalization and segregation of those labeled with a mental illness.
Change in the identity of an individual. This was a major theme during the Renaissance.

It could be said that the degeneration theory and theories similar to this theory are the most extreme examples of social death. The idea of degeneration has been popular in both right-wing and left-wing politics. Both left-wing and right-wing politics have used the word decadence to describe social groups whose social, moral, religious, aesthetic, or political commitments tend towards the inhibition of any or all forms of progress (as used by some critics on the left to describe their opponents on the right) or towards the undermining of fundamental forms of order (as used by some critics on the right to describe their opponents on the left). In either political optic, the forces of decadence may be internal or external. Internally, the members of political opposition may represent those who have allowed essential ideals to lapse from their view of the world. Externally, members of another society may be considered as cherishing ideals which introduce forces of collapse into the worlds wherein they are immigrants.

Slavery and Social Death
The chief proponent of the relationship between social death and slavery is Orlando Patterson, who states his findings in his 1982 book, Slavery and Social Death: A Comparative Study.  Patterson first defines slavery as "one of the most extreme forms of the relation of domination, approaching the limits of total power from the viewpoint of the master, and of total powerlessness from the viewpoint of the slave."  Social death had both internal and external effects on enslaved people, changing their views of themselves and the way they were regarded by society.  Slavery and social death can be linked in all civilizations where slavery existed, including China, Rome, Africa, Byzantium, Greece, Europe, and the Americas.

The beginning of social death comes from the initial enslavement process, which would most likely come from capture during a battle.  A captive would be spared from death and created a slave, although this was a conditional commutation since death was only suspended as long as the slave submitted to his powerlessness.  This pardon from death was replaced with social death, which would manifest both physically and psychologically.

Externally, slaves would undergo the loss of their identities through such practices as replacing their names, being branded to indicate their social condition, given a specific dress code that further established them as slaves to the public, castration, and having their heads shaved.  Each of these acts alienated the slaves from their previous identities and symbolized their loss of freedom and power and their total dependency on their master’s will.  The psychological process of social death included the effect of rejection as a member of society and becoming genealogically isolated through the loss of heritage and the right to pass on their ancestry to their children.  In fact, all social bonds were seen as illegitimate unless they were validated by the master.  Enslaved people were denied an independent social structure and were not even deemed fully human, as they were only seen as a representation of their master and had no honor or power of their own. The degree to which these practices took place was based on the two modes of social death, intrusive and extrusive.  In the intrusive mode, rituals were developed for the incorporation of an external enemy into the culture as a slave.  In the extrusive mode, traditions evolved for including those who have "fallen into slavery" from within society into the slave status. Both of these modes provided a process for the institutionalization of socially dead individuals.

Power played an essential role in the relationship between a slave and master, and violence was often deemed a necessary component of slavery. A slave was seen to have no worth. They had no name of their own and no honor. Instead, their worth and honor was transferred to the master and gave him an elevated social status among his peers. Violence within the relationship was considered essential because of the low motivation of the enslaved people, and it was also a factor in creating social death and exercising power over the slaves. Whipping was not only a method of punishment but also a consciously chosen symbolic device to remind slaves of their status. This physical violence had other psychological effects as well, gradually creating an attitude of self-blame and an acknowledgement of the complete control that a master had.  Interviews with former American slaves included statements such as "slaves get the masters they deserve" and "I was so bad I needed the whipping", demonstrating the justification that slaves had no right to expect kindness or compassion because of their status in society and the devastating mental effects from social death.

These effects demonstrated the expectations of the behavior of a slave who had experienced social death.  The individuals viewed as the ultimate slaves, the palace eunuchs from Byzantium and China, were essentially a paradox.  These slaves were trusted by emperors and could be extremely influential.  They were expected to be loyal, brave, and obedient, yet they were still considered low and debased and were shunned by society.

While Orlando Patterson gives the most extensive study on slavery and social death, he has several critics of his analysis.  Those who reviewed the book disliked his refusal to define slaves as property because other groups could fit this definition as well, including women and children.  Patterson also does not compare the treatment of slaves to other socially marginalized groups, such as prostitutes, criminals, and indentured servants.  The third critique given about Patterson’s book is the lack of primary sources.  Commentators noted that the argument in Slavery and Social Death would have been much stronger had Patterson utilized testimony from enslaved people of their views and meanings of honor, domination, and community.

Other definitions

In the context of health, social death—when the ailing person no longer has the consciousness to communicate with others—can occur. Social death occurs during the progression of Alzheimer's disease and to patients rendered unconscious through palliative sedation (a type of end-of-life care) to reduce pain before an imminent death.
Employees who retire from their careers can experience another example of social death because of their removal from the daily work lives of co-workers.

See also
 Herem (censure)
 Disengagement theory
 Excommunication
 Exile
 Ostracism
 Shunning
 Slavery
 Imprisonment
 Civil death

Notes

References
 Claudia Card, Genocide and Social Death, Hypatia, Vol. 18, No. 1 (Winter 2003)
 Family and Psycho-Social Dimensions of Death and Dying in African Americans, Key Topics on End-of-Life Care for African Americans, Duke Institute on Care at the End of Life and the Initiative to Improve Palliative Care for African Americans
 Brian Garavaglia,  Avoiding the Tendency to Medicalize the Grieving Process: Reconciliation Rather Than Resolution, The New Social Worker Online, Summer 2006
 John Edwin Mason, Social Death and Resurrection: Slavery and Emancipation in South Africa, 
 Jaap W. Ouwerkerk, et al., Avoiding the Social Death Penalty: Threat of Ostracism and Cooperation in Social Dilemmas, The 7th Annual Sydney Symposium of Social Psychology: The Social Outcast: Ostracism, Social Exclusion, Rejection, & Bullying, Mar. 16-18, 2004 (Alternate link)
 
 Matelita Ragogo, Social Death Part of AIDS Tragedy, Says HIV-Positive Advocate, Agence France Presse, Sept. 9, 2002
 Deborah C. Reidy, Stigma is Social Death: Mental Health Consumers/Survivors Talk About Stigma In Their Lives, Alaska Mental Health Consumer Web
 Stuart Waldman, Surviving a Fate Worse than Death: The Plight of the Homebound Elderly, Loss, Grief & Care: A Journal of Professional Practice Vol. 6, No. 4 (May 14, 1993), ISSN 8756-4610
 Trish Williams, Death, Dying and Grieving, Losing Tom: A Documentary Film

Social rejection
Sociological terminology